The 1931 Boston Braves season was the 61st season of the franchise. The team finished 7th place in the National League with a record of 64 wins and 90 losses, 37 games behind the Saint Louis Cardinals.

Offseason 
 October 14, 1930: Bob Smith and Jimmy Welsh were traded by the Braves to the Chicago Cubs for Bill McAfee and Wes Schulmerich.

Regular season

Season standings

Record vs. opponents

Roster

Player stats

Batting

Starters by position 
Note: Pos = Position; G = Games played; AB = At bats; H = Hits; Avg. = Batting average; HR = Home runs; RBI = Runs batted in

Other batters 
Note: G = Games played; AB = At bats; H = Hits; Avg. = Batting average; HR = Home runs; RBI = Runs batted in

Pitching

Starting pitchers 
Note: G = Games pitched; IP = Innings pitched; W = Wins; L = Losses; ERA = Earned run average; SO = Strikeouts

Other pitchers 
Note: G = Games pitched; IP = Innings pitched; W = Wins; L = Losses; ERA = Earned run average; SO = Strikeouts

Relief pitchers 
Note: G = Games pitched; W = Wins; L = Losses; SV = Saves; ERA = Earned run average; SO = Strikeouts

Farm system

References

External links
1931 Boston Braves season at Baseball Reference

Boston Braves seasons
Boston Braves
Boston Braves
1930s in Boston